Book design is the art of incorporating the content, style, format, design, and sequence of the various components and elements of a book into a coherent unit. In the words of renowned typographer Jan Tschichold (1902–1974), book design, "though largely forgotten today, [relies upon] methods and rules upon which it is impossible to improve, [and which] have been developed over centuries. To produce perfect books, these rules have to be brought back to life and applied". Richard Hendel describes book design as "an arcane subject", and refers to the need for a context to understand what that means.

Structure

Modern books are paginated consecutively, and all pages are counted in the pagination whether or not the numbers appear (see also: blind folio). The page number, or folio, may be found at the top or the bottom of the page, often flush left verso, flush right recto. The folio may also be printed at the bottom of the page, and in that location it is called a drop folio. Drop folios usually appear either centered on each page or flush left verso and flush right recto. The book contains the main text and a number of paratexts that comprise all of the additional matter that is included in the book.

Front matter
Front matter (or preliminaries; shortened to "prelims") comprises the first section of a book, and is usually the smallest section in terms of the number of pages. Front-matter pages are traditionally numbered in lower-case Roman numerals (i, ii, iii, iv, v, etc.), which prevents renumbering the remainder of a book when front-matter content is added at the last moment, such as a dedication page or additional acknowledgments. Page number is omitted on blank pages and display pages (i.e., such stand-alone pages as those for the half title, frontispiece, title page, colophon, dedication, and epigraph), and it is either omitted or a drop folio is used on the opening page of each section of the front matter (e.g., table of contents, foreword, preface). Front matter generally appears only in the first of a multi-volume work, although some elements (such as a table of contents or index) may appear in each volume.

The following table defines some common types of front matter, and the "voice" (or point of view) in which each can be said to be given:

Body matter

The structure of a work—and especially of its body matter—is often described hierarchically.

 Volumes
 A volume is a set of leaves bound together. Thus each work is either a volume, or is divided into volumes.
 Books and parts
 Single-volume works account for most of the non-academic consumer market in books. A single volume may embody either a part of a book or the whole of a book; in some works, parts encompass multiple books, while in others, books may consist of multiple parts.
 Chapters and sections
 A chapter or section may be contained within a part or a book. When both chapters and sections are used in the same work, the sections are more often contained within chapters than the reverse. Chapters and sections may have intertitles, also known as internal titles.
Modules and units
In some books the chapters are grouped into bigger parts, sometimes called modules. The numbering of the chapters can begin again at the start of every module. In educational books, especially, the chapters are often called units.

The first page of the actual text of a book is the opening page, which often incorporates special design features, such as initials. Arabic numbering starts at this first page. If the text is introduced by a second half title or opens with a part title, the half title or part title counts as page one. As in the front matter, page numbers are omitted on blank pages, and are either omitted or a drop folio is used on the opening page of each part and chapter. On pages containing only illustrations or tables, page numbers are usually omitted, except in the case of a long sequence of figures or tables.

The following are two instructive examples:
 The Lord of the Rings has three parts (either in one volume each, or in a single volume), with each part containing two books, each containing, in turn, multiple chapters.
 The Christian Bible (usually bound as a single volume) comprises two "testaments" (which might more typically be described as "parts", and differ in length by a factor of three or four), each containing dozens of books of varying lengths.  In turn, each book (except for the shortest) contains multiple chapters, which are traditionally divided (for purposes of citation) into "verses" each containing roughly one independent clause.

Back matter (end matter)

The back matter, also known as end matter, if used, normally consists of one or more of the following components:

Arabic numbering continues for the back matter.

Front cover, spine, and back cover of the dust-jacket

The front cover is the front of the book, and is marked appropriately by text or graphics in order to identify it as such (namely as the very beginning of the book). The front cover usually contains at least the title or author, with possibly an appropriate illustration.

On the inside of the cover page, extending to the facing page is the front endpaper sometimes referred as FEP. The free half of the end paper is called a flyleaf. Traditionally, in hand-bound books, the endpaper was just a sheet of blank or ornamented paper physically masking and reinforcing the connection between the cover and the body of the book. In modern publishing it can be either plain, as in many text-oriented books, or variously ornamented and illustrated in books such as picture books, other children's literature, some arts and craft and hobbyist books, novelty/gift-market and coffee table books, and graphic novels. These books have an audience and traditions of their own where the graphic design and immediacy is especially important and publishing tradition and formality are less important.

The spine is the vertical edge of a book as it normally stands on a bookshelf. Early books did not have titles on their spines; rather they were shelved flat with their spines inward and titles written with ink along their fore edges. Modern books display their titles on their spines.

In languages with Chinese-influenced writing systems, the title is written top-to-bottom, as is the language in general. In languages written from left to right, the spine text can be pillar (one letter per line), transverse (text line perpendicular to long edge of spine) and along spine. Conventions differ about the direction in which the title along the spine is rotated:

 top-to-bottom (descending):
In texts published or printed in the United States, the United Kingdom, the Commonwealth, Scandinavia and the Netherlands, the spine text, when the book is standing 
upright, runs from the top to the bottom. This means that when the book is lying flat with the front cover upwards, the title is oriented left-to-right on the spine. This practice is reflected in the industry standards ANSI/NISO Z39.41 and ISO 6357., but ″... lack of agreement in the matter persisted among English-speaking countries as late as the middle of the twentieth century, when books bound in Britain still tended to have their titles read up the spine ...″.

In many continental European countries, where the ascending system has been used in the past, the descending system has  been used in recent decades, probably due to the influence of the English-speaking countries, such as Italy, Russia, Poland and elsewhere.

 bottom-to-top (ascending):
In many continental European and Latin American countries, the spine text, when the book is standing upright, runs from the bottom up, so the title can be read by tilting the head to the left. This allows the reader to read spines of books shelved in alphabetical order in accordance to the usual way left-to-right and top-to-bottom.

The spine usually contains all, or some, of four elements (besides decoration, if any), and in the following order: (1) author, editor, or compiler; (2) title; (3) publisher; and (4) publisher logo.

On the inside of the back cover page, extending from the facing page before it, is the endpaper. Its design matches the front endpaper and, in accordance with it, contains either plain paper or pattern, image etc.

The back cover often contains biographical matter about the author or editor, and quotes from other sources praising the book. It may also contain a summary or description of the book

Binding

Books are classified under two categories according to the physical nature of their binding. The designation hardcover (or hardback) refers to books with stiff covers, as opposed to flexible ones. The binding of a hardcover book usually includes boards (often made of paperboard) covered in cloth, leather, or other materials. The binding is usually sewn to the pages using string stitching.

A less expensive binding method is that used for paperback books (sometimes called softback or softcover). Most paperbacks are bound with paper or light cardboard, though other materials (such as plastic) are used. The covers are flexible and usually bound to the pages using glue (perfect binding). Some small paperback books are sub-classified as pocketbooks. These paperbacks are smaller than usual—small enough to barely fit into a pocket (especially the back pocket of one's trousers). However, this capacity to fit into a pocket diminishes with increasing number of pages and increasing thickness of the book. Such a book may still be designated as a pocketbook.

Other items
Some books such as Bibles or dictionaries may have a thumb index to help find material quickly. Gold leaf may also be applied to the edges of the pages, so that when closed, the side, top, and bottom of the book have a golden color. On some books, a design may be printed on the edges, or marbling or a simple colour applied. Some artist's books go even further, by using fore-edge painting. Pop-up elements and fold-out pages may be used to add dimensions to the page in different ways. Children's books commonly incorporate a wide array of design features built into the fabric of the book. Some books for preschoolers include textured fabric, plastic on other materials. Die-cut techniques in the work of Eric Carle are one example. Clear or reflective surfaces, flaps, textiles and scratch-and-sniff are other possible features.

Page spread

A basic unit in book design is the page spread. The left page (called verso) and right page (called recto) are of the same size and aspect ratio, and are centered on the gutter where they are bound together at the spine.

The design of each individual page, on the other hand, is governed by the canons of page construction.

The possible layout of the sets of letters of the alphabet, or words, on a page is determined by the so-called print space, and is also an element in the design of the page of the book. There must be sufficient space at the spine of the book if the text is to be visible. On the other hand, the other three margins of the page, which frame the book, are made of the appropriate size for both practical and aesthetic reasons.

Print space
The print space or type area determines the effective area on the paper of a book, journal or other press work. The print space is limited by the surrounding borders, or in other words the gutters outside the printed area.

See also
 Galley proof
 Imprint
 Letterpress
 Page numbering
 Visual design
 Recto and verso
 Page (paper)

Other types of books
 Interactive children's book
 Interactive fiction
 Pop-up book

References

Citations

Sources

Further reading

External links
Dutch Art Nouveau and Art Deco Book Design (archived 26 May 2013)
Binding design and paper conservation of antique books, albums and documents (archived 3 December 2013)
The Rollo Books by Jacob Abbott: an example of first edition designs
"Signs – Books – Networks" virtual exhibition of the German Museum of Books and Writing, i.a. with a thematic module on book design

 
Book publishing